G.9970 (also known as G.hnta) is a Recommendation developed by ITU-T that describes the generic transport architecture for home networks and their interfaces to a provider's access network.

G.9970 was developed by Study Group 15, Question 1. G.9970 received Consent on December 12, 2008 and was Approved on January 13, 2009.

Relationship with G.hn

G.9970 (G.hnta) and G.9960 (G.hn) are two ITU-T Recommendations that address home networking in a complementary manner. While G.9970 addresses layer 3 (network layer) of the home network architecture, G.9960 addresses layers 1 (physical layer) and 2 (data link layer).

References

Networking standards
Network protocols
Open standards
International standards
Computer networks
Internet Standards
ITU-T recommendations
ITU-T G Series Recommendations